The 1976 IIHF European U19 Championship was the ninth playing of the IIHF European Junior Championships.

Group A 
Played in Koprivnice and Opava, Czechoslovakia from March 21–29, 1976.

First round 
Group 1
{| class="wikitable" bgcolor="#EFEFFF" width="50%"
|-bgcolor="#BCD2EE"
! Team
! URS
! FIN
! POL
! TCH'B! GF/GA
! Points
|- bgcolor="#ccffcc" align="center"
| align="left" | 1.  
| style="background:#000000;" |
| 6:1
| 9:2
| 4:2
| 15:3
| 4
|- bgcolor="#ccffcc" align="center"
| align="left" | 2.   
| 1:6
| style="background:#000000;" |
| 5:2
| style="background:#000000;" |
| 6:8
| 2
|- bgcolor="#ffcccc" align="center"
| align="left" | 3.   
| 2:9
| 2:5
| style="background:#000000;" |
| 2:11
| 4:14
| 0
|- bgcolor="#ffcccc" align="center"
| align="left" | NR B  
| 2:4
| style="background:#000000;" |
| 11:2
| style="background:#000000;" |
| 13:6
| 2
|}NOTE''' Bulgaria was supposed to participate in this group, but could not because of an epidemic of the Grippe.  An under 18 Czech team filled in, but arrived too late to play their game against Finland.  None of their games counted in the standings, so their totals are only shown for interest.
Group 2

 Final round 
Championship round

Placing round
{| class="wikitable" bgcolor="#EFEFFF" width="50%"
|-bgcolor="#BCD2EE"
! Team
! FRG
! POL
! SUI
! TCH'B'! GF/GA
! Points
|- bgcolor="#CAE1FF" align="center"
| align="left" | 1.   
| style="background:#000000;" |
| 11:5
| (7:5)
| 1:10| 18:10
| 4
|- bgcolor="#CAE1FF" align="center"
| align="left" | 2.   
| 5:11
| style="background:#000000;" |
| 8:4
| (2:11)| 13:15
| 2
|- bgcolor="#CAE1FF" align="center"
| align="left" | 3.  
| (5:7)
| 4:8
| style="background:#000000;" |
| 2:16| 9:15
| 0
|- bgcolor="#CAE1FF" align="center"
| align="left" | NR B 
| 10:1| (11:2)| 16:2| style="background:#000000;" |
| 37:5| 6|}
The Czechoslovakia B games do not count in the standings.  Bulgaria was relegated to Group B for 1977.Tournament Awards
Top Scorer: Ernst Höfner  (12 Points)
Top Goalie: Pelle Lindbergh
Top Defenceman:Viacheslav Fetisov
Top Forward: Valeri Yevstifeyev

 Group B 
Played in Bucharest and Ploiești, Romania from March 13–21, 1976

First round
Group 1

Group 2

 Placing round 

Results for the fifth and the seventh place games are taken from the International Ice Hockey Encyclopedia and disagree with the scores posted on passionhockey.com's archive page.Romania was promoted to Group A for 1977.''

References

Complete results

Junior
IIHF European Junior Championship tournament
International ice hockey competitions hosted by Romania
International ice hockey competitions hosted by Czechoslovakia
Jun
Sport in Opava
March 1976 sports events in Europe
Sport in Ploiești
Sports competitions in Bucharest
Jun
20th century in Bucharest